Wellpond Green is a hamlet near the A120 road and the town of Bishop's Stortford, in the county of Hertfordshire, England.  Wellpond Green contains 4 listed buildings.

At the 2011 Census the population of the hamlet was included in the civil parish of Standon.

References 

Hamlets in Hertfordshire
East Hertfordshire District